Diego Camacho (born May 21, 1983) is a tennis player from Bolivia, who represented his native country at the 2000 Summer Olympics in Sydney. There he was defeated in the first round by America's Jeff Tarango. Camacho reached his highest singles ATP-ranking on March 19, 2001, when he became the number 954 of the world.  Camacho played collegiate tennis for the University of Tulsa.

Camacho played for the Bolivian Davis Cup team from 2001 to 2008, posting a 4–5 record in singles and a 5–5 record in doubles.

As of late 2007, Camacho has been working at a Fitness Center in Joplin, Missouri. In 2007 he coached the boys tennis team of Thomas Jefferson Independent Day School and led them to the state championships.

Camacho was the Bolivian Davis Cup Captain in 2009.

Camacho worked with professional tennis player Arnau Brugues from Spain as his personal tennis coach from May 2009 to July 2010 on the ATP professional circuit.

References

External links
 
 
 
 TulsaHurricane.com profile

1983 births
Living people
Bolivian expatriates in the United States
Bolivian male tennis players
Olympic tennis players of Bolivia
Sportspeople from Joplin, Missouri
Sportspeople from Santa Cruz de la Sierra
Tennis players at the 2000 Summer Olympics
University of Tulsa alumni
Tennis players at the 2003 Pan American Games
Pan American Games competitors for Bolivia
Tulsa Golden Hurricane men's tennis players